Abdullah al-Qasemi  (1907 – 9 January 1996) was a Saudi Arabian 20th-century writer and intellectual. He is one of the most controversial intellectuals in the Arab world because of his radical change from defending Salafism to defending atheism and rejecting organized religion. He questioned the existence of God and criticized religions, which resulted in the allegations of him becoming an atheist, therefore his books were banned all over the Arab world.

After surviving assassination attempts in Egypt and Lebanon while suffering imprisonment under instigation from the Yemeni government, he was hospitalized at the Ain-Shams hospital in Cairo on December 12, 1995 and died of cancer on January 9, 1996.

Biography

Education
Al-Qasemi was born in Buraydah in the Emirate of Nejd and Hasa (present-day Saudi Arabia). Al-Qasemi first joined the Sheikh Ali Mahmoud school, his father died in 1922, and al-Qasemi was then freed from the constraints imposed on him by his father, he then continued his studies.  The merchant Abdulaziz Al-Rashed Al-Humaid was impressed by al-Qasemi, so he took him to Iraq, India and Syria, finally, Al-Qasemi resumed his studies at the Sheikh Amin Shanqeeti school in Zubair in Iraq after then he traveled to India where he spent two years learning in school, he learned Arabic, hadiths, and the foundations of the Islamic Sharia, he then returned to Iraq where he joined al-Kazimiyah school, he returned to Damascus, finally, he decided to live in Cairo.

al-Qasemi and Salafi philosophy
Al-Qasemi has studied at the Al-Azhar University in Cairo in 1927, but he was soon expelled because of his book "The chandelier in the sweep of the Dark Darkness" , which he had written in response to an article by Al-Azhar scholar Yusuf al-Degwy , entitled  "The litigiousness and ignorance of Wahhabists" published in the Journal "Nour al-Islam" in 1931. Subsequently Abdullah al-Qasemi wrote several books attacking the scholars of Al-Azhar.

al-Qasemi and free philosophy
After this incident, al-Qasemi changed his way of thinking, defending secularism and scepticism and criticizing religion to the point where his opponents labelled him "atheist". His most important books - written after he turned against the Salafi ideology - are: "There are the cuffs " and "They lie to see God beautiful" and his book "Arabs are a sonorous phenomenon" (sic). He survived two assassination attempts in Egypt and Lebanon and suffered imprisonment in Egypt under instigation from the Yemeni government, because of his great influence on Yemeni students who, because of their frequent meetings with him, were deeply influenced by his thoughts. Such influence was perceived by the Yemeni government as negative and not suitable to Islam.

Death
He was hospitalized at the Ain-Shams hospital in Cairo on December 12, 1995 and died of cancer on 9 January 1996, and according to his will, he was buried along with his wife in the "Bab Al-Wazir" cemetery in Egypt.

Works

Books
Abdullah Al-Qasemi's works have rarely been translated. Here is a non-exhaustive list:
 The Universe Judges God
 The Pride of History Is in Crisis
 The Wahhabist Revolution
 What Is This Universe’s Conscience?
 These are the Cuffs
 They Lie in Order to See God Beautiful 
 Arabs Are a Sonorous Phenomenon
 Humans Disobey to Build Civilizations
 O Reason! Who Saw You?
 The Conflict Between Islam and Idolatry
 Pharaoh Writes the Book of Exodus
 In Order That Harun al-Rashid Does Not Come Back

Quotes
 Men find their religions as they find their homelands, their lands, their homes and their fathers. They just find them, they do not search for them, do not understand them, do not choose them either.
 Religions triumph in the battles they avoid, they don't fight against reason nor through reason. They never go in free fights against reason. And that is why they are triumphant.
 Man does not want the knowledge that would hurt his will. He prefers to be silly but happy than intelligent and poor.
 Whoever suicide with or without an idea, is nobler and more courageous than any martyr in any war.
 We wanted, then imagined, we believed, and in the end, we were convinced.
 Those who do not know how to smile finally institutionalize tears and call to consider this as an adoration.
 The occupation of our brains by gods is the worst form of occupation. 
 What is the nature of the creator who forces his creatures to need misery, pollution, sadness. To be in the end a happy creature.

References

1907 births
1996 deaths
Deaths from cancer in Egypt
Former Muslim critics of Islam
Critics of Sunni Islam
Persecution of atheists
People persecuted by Muslims
Saudi Arabian atheists
Saudi Arabian former Muslims
Saudi Arabian writers
20th-century atheists
Former Muslims turned agnostics or atheists
Burials in Egypt